Machpelah Cemetery may refer to:

Machpelah Cemetery (Mount Sterling, Kentucky)
Machpelah Cemetery (Lexington, Missouri), listed on the US National Register of Historic Places in Lafayette County
Machpelah Cemetery (North Bergen, New Jersey)
Machpelah Cemetery (Le Roy, New York)
Machpelah Cemetery (Queens), New York

See also
 Machpelah Cave, biblical burial site